Panic on the Air is a 1936 American drama film directed by D. Ross Lederman and starring Lew Ayres.

Cast
 Lew Ayres as Jerry Franklin
 Florence Rice as Mary Connor  Cremer
 Benny Baker as Andy
 Edwin Maxwell as Gordon
 Charles C. Wilson as Chief Insp. Fitzgerald
 Murray Alper as Marvin Danker
 Wyrley Birch as Maj. Bliss
 Robert Emmett Keane as Cillani
 Gene Morgan as Lefty Dugan
 Eddie Lee as McNulty

References

External links
 

1936 films
1936 drama films
American drama films
American black-and-white films
1930s English-language films
Columbia Pictures films
Films directed by D. Ross Lederman
1930s American films